The Arrival is the debut EP by the Australian hip hop trio Bliss n Eso, released under the group's original name Bliss n Esoterikizm.  Bliss n Esoterikizm proved to be too much of a mouthful for most people so it was shortened.

The EP was produced by DJ Tokoloshe and features Nick Toth (scratches/turntablism) on "Next Shit" and MC Layla (vocals) on "Dreams".

Track listing

References

2000 debut EPs
Bliss n Eso albums